Custer Township, Kansas may refer to several places:

 Custer Township, Decatur County, Kansas
 Custer Township, Mitchell County, Kansas, in Mitchell County, Kansas

See also 
 List of Kansas townships
 Custer Township (disambiguation)

Kansas township disambiguation pages